Jorge Luis Valdivia Toro (born 19 October 1983) is a Chilean former professional footballer who played as an attacking midfielder.

Product of Colo-Colo youth ranks, Valdivia had an impressing loan spell at Universidad de Concepción during his debut season in 2003. Then after another two loan spells in Europe, he definitely joined Colo-Colo in 2005 winning one year later the Torneo Apertura title, before moving to Palmeiras. Since joining Brazilian club, he spent seven years playing for Verdão — interrupted by his spell at Al Ain — and has appeared in more than 100 games, winning one Paulistão in 2008, a Copa do Brasil in 2012 and a Série B title in 2013.

A Chilean international between 2004 until 2017, he was an integral member of the 2015 Copa América winning squad (the first ever achieved by his national team in its history), having previously appeared in two past editions (2007 and 2011) and in the 2010 and 2014 World Cups. During his years active, Valdivia has reached 7 goals in 78 caps.

He is considered one of the greatest playmakers in the Chilean football history and has been praised by football legends like Pelé or Carlos Valderrama. His figure is very prominent at Palmeiras recent history, where he is mostly a divisive figure, but more often considered to be an idol. He also enjoys great fame at Al Ain.

Due to his talent, he was given the nicknames "El Mago" (the wizard) throughout his career. Valdivia was a "classic number 10", who was best known for his passing ability and skills.

Early life and background
Valdivia was born in Maracay, Venezuela, in 1983, to Chilean parents Luis Valdivia and Elizabeth Toro, because of his father's work as a correspondent for LAN airlines, which he did from 1974. In 1985, the Valdivia family returned their homeland moving to Santiago. There they settled in the commune of La Florida. Likely due to these years he spent in Venezuela, he was interested in baseball. After moving to Chile, he developed his taste for football.

Club career

Early career
In 1993, Valdivia joined Colo-Colo’s football academy. He was promoted to first team in 2003, at the age of nineteen. Nevertheless, he was demotivated by his teammates, like captain Marcelo Espina, complemented by the misbehavior outside the field.

Colo-Colo

Loan to Universidad Concepción
After falling out of Colo-Colo's first team figures, Valdivia was loaned to fellow Chilean Primera División side Universidad de Concepción. He made his professional debut for Concepción on 16 March 2003, coming on as a second-half substitute for Pablo Abdala in a 2–1 Primera División away loss against Cobresal. During his first start on 6 April, he scored his team's last in a 3–1 home win against Unión Española.

Following that match, Valdivia became an undisputed starter for the club, contributing with the opener in a 4–3 home win against Universidad de Chile on 16 June, as his side qualified to the quarterfinals of the Torneo Apertura. In his first season at Concepción-based side, he impressed for his skills. There, Valdivia scored seven goals in 30 games.

Loans to Rayo Vallecano and Servette
That allowed him to go on loan again, this time to Segunda División side Rayo Vallecano, where he only played five matches and failed to score a goal.

After another loan spell at Switzerland's Servette, Valdivia could have played for Boca Juniors, club that was willing to pay US$1.5 million dollars for him, but nevertheless the talks about the transfer didn't have success and, finally, he definitely returned to Colo-Colo.

Return and breakthrough
In 2005, he returned to Colo-Colo. Likewise, that year he complemented his football career with studies of journalism at the University of the Americas, career which he didn't finished.

Then, in 2006, Valdivia helped his club to achieve the Torneo Apertura, where once again he reached an impressive performance, which was polished by the coach in the age, Claudio Borghi. Noteworthy, he highlighted in a team which had players like Chilean internationals Claudio Bravo, Matías Fernández and Humberto Suazo.

Palmeiras
On 5 August 2006, Valdivia completed his move to Brazilian club Palmeiras for a US$3.5 million transfer fee. His signing was the club's most expensive transfer – in the year – for a foreign player. After an unsuccessful season, he had a revitalizing 2007 where he reached four honours for his performances: Campeonato Paulista Most Valuable Player, Prêmio Craque do Brasileirão, Bola de Ouro and Troféu Mesa Redonda, that put him as the season's best playmaker of Brazilian football. His further consecration at the Verdão was the obtention of 2008 Campeonato Paulista title, where for his performances he came to cost US$40 dollars.

Al Ain

In August 2008, it was reported that Valdivia joined United Arab Emirates' Al Ain in an €8 million deal for a two-year contract. At the Emirati club, he won the Etisalat Emirates Cup, President Cup and the Super Cup. There, he became a top idol in the history of the club, so much so that Mohamed bin Zayed Al Nahyan, president of the club, offered him a lifetime contract (which Valdivia didn't sign).

Palmeiras return
During and after the 2010 FIFA World Cup, there were persistent rumours about his possible return to Palmeiras, which finally occurred on 26 July following the agree between Al-Ain and São Paulo-based side for a €16 million deal. In his presentation on 14 August, Valdivia was received by 15.000 fans at Estádio do Pacaembu. However, he was heavily criticized for his bad performances and for being out of shape; a topic that was recurrent during all his spell at the club.

Al Wahda
On 25 June 2015, it was reported that Valdivia would return to United Arab Emirates to sign for Al-Wahda, after rejecting an offer from China's Guangzhou Evergrande. The player and the club reached a two-season contract and a US$2.8 million salary per year.

Colo-Colo return
On 19 June 2017, Valdivia returned to his first club Colo-Colo. In December 2019, Colo-Colo announced they would be not renewing his contract.

Morelia
On January 16, 2020, Valdivia signed with Liga MX side Morelia.

Retirement
On 1 July 2022, Valdivia confirmed that he had already decided to retire from football on the radio program Los Tenores (The Tenors) from ADN Radio Chile, looking to become a football manager and to work in TV media.

International career
Born in Venezuela,  Valdivia was eligible to play for the national team of either country. However, he appeared with Chile's U20 in the 2003 South American Youth Championship, only making two appearances in a tournament which Chile finished last in the group stage.

Valdivia also represented his country in the 2004 Pre-Olympic Tournament — alongside players like Claudio Bravo, Jean Beausejour, Luis Pedro Figueroa or Mark González — where he had an impressive performance. In June of that year, he earned his first senior cap for Chile national team against Mexico. Also that year he became part of the 2006 FIFA World Cup qualifying nominees under Juvenal Olmos as head coach, who choose him to play the Pre-Olympic. Nevertheless, Chile failed to qualify the World Cup.

Valdivia scored his first international goal for Chile in an exhibition match against Paraguay in Vina del Mar on 16 November 2006 during a 3–2 victory.

In June 2007, Valdivia was chosen in Chile's Copa América squad, which they were eliminated in quarterfinals after a 6–1 thrash of Brazil. However, before the game against Brazil, he alongside five players went on a spree and once leaked the press they received a 20-game ban from the federation (ANFP). Then Nelson Acosta resigned as national team coach.

A year and half later, he was re-considered by Marcelo Bielsa after calling-up him to a friendly game with Turkey on 5 August 2008. One month later, on 7 September, Valdivia made his debut for the 2010 World Cup qualifying in a 3–0 loss with Brazil, which he was sent off for double-yellow card. On 10 October 2009, he scored the last goal of the 4–2 win over Colombia at Medellín that finished Chile's 12-year World Cup absence since 1998.

Being a key player during qualification, he was selected in the 23-man World Cup roster and participated in the most of the preparatory games, scoring a goal even in a 3–0 win over Zambia in Calama. However at the World Cup, he performed well despite of playing as Second striker, highlighting his 35-yard though pass that broke Switzerland's defensive and allowed Esteban Paredes cross for Mark González header goal. Then Chile was eliminated after losing again to Brazil.

2011–2014 

In January 2011, Bielsa left abruptly stepped down as coach following differences with the federation, but Valdivia continued being considered in La Roja by Claudio Borghi, his former coach when he played in Colo-Colo. In June, he was included in the 23-man list to face the Copa América. He made three starts of Chile's four games in the competition, which they were eliminated in quarterfinals by Venezuela (where Valdivia had a crossbar), rival which only one-time Chile lost in its history. However, Valdivia was included in the team of the tournament. Months later in December 2011 before a 2014 World Cup qualifying game with Uruguay in Montevideo, he was involved in another scandal alongside Jean Beausejour, Gonzalo Jara, Arturo Vidal and Carlos Carmona after arriving 45 minutes later and intoxicated to the team's concentration at Juan Pinto Durán. They subsequently received a 10-game ban and Valdivia once finished the punishment it wasn't be considered by Borghi during the qualifiers and friendlies.

On 8 March 2013, after 16 months of the incident, Valdivia was re-called by Jorge Sampaoli, including him in the call-up for the qualifying games against Peru and Uruguay. His official re-debut was on 7 September against Venezuela in a 3–0 victory at Estadio Nacional. On 15 October, following a 2–1 win over Ecuador, Chile reached its eight qualification to a World Cup and its first consecutively.

On 1 June 2014, Valdivia was selected in Chile squad for the 2014 FIFA World Cup in Brazil. On 13 June, Valdivia scored his first World Cup goal during Chile's opening group match against Australia, netting the team's second goal in a 3–1 victory. The following two group games he came as substitute against Spain and the Netherlands, being an unused substitute in the round of 16 game against Brazil, which eliminated Chile on the penalties after 1–1 at Estádio Mineirão. The last fact motivated Valdivia to announce his international retirement, communicated via Twitter on 17 July 2014. However, in November he backtracked his decision later on, and was called for friendly matches against Venezuela and Uruguay, selling his re-debut with a goal and a brilliant performance in 5–0 win over the Venezuelans at Talcahuano.

2015 Copa América
Participating in the most preparatory games prior the 2015 Copa América held in his country, Valdivia scored a goal against El Salvador (the game's only one score at Rancagua) and was included in the 23 man list to face the cup. On 12 June, he was a starter in the Copa América opening game with Ecuador: a 2–0 victory for Chile. The following group match with México, Valdivia was praised by the press for play the full 90 minutes, be trasendental in all Chile goals and for have scored a badly canceled goal during that 3–3 draw. After another highlighting match in a 5–0 win over Bolivia where assisted Alexis Sánchez in Chile's second goal, he was a key player in the 1–0 victory against Uruguay (defending champions) for the quarterfinals, match remembered by the incident between Gonzalo Jara and the striker Edinson Cavani. Following the semifinal's triumph over Perú (2–1) that put Chile in a Copa América final after 28 years since 1987,

Valdivia was a starter in the final against Argentina at the Estadio Nacional. However, he was replaced by Matías Fernández on 78th minute in a substitution before the extratime and the penalties, which infuriated him when he left the field. Finally, Chile won 4–1 on the penalties and reached its history's first ever continental title.

Personal life
Valdivia married to Chilean model Daniela Aránguiz, with whom he has two children. Valdivia and Aránguiz are separated.

About football, he has several relatives who have played it at different levels: His maternal grandfather, Juan Toro, who played for Chile senior team; his older brother, Luis or Quique as he is known, who played at youth categories of Palestino; his half-brother, Hugo Bravo, who played for clubs such as Palestino and Universidad de Chile; and his younger brother, Claudio, who played for Audax Italiano and Palmeiras B.

Post retirement
On October and November 2021, Valdivia performed as a football commentator for the TV program ESPN F90 until he moved to Mexico to join Necaxa for the 2022 season. Following his definitive retirement from football, in July 2022 he returned to ESPN Chile as a panelist for the program ESPN F360.

Career statistics

Club

International

International goals
Scores and results list Chile's goal tally first.

Honours

Club
Colo-Colo
 Primera División de Chile: 2006 Clausura, 2017 Transición
 Supercopa de Chile: 2017, 2018

Palmeiras
 Campeonato Paulista: 2008
 Copa do Brasil: 2012
 Campeonato Brasileiro Série B: 2013

Al Ain
 Etisalat Emirates Cup: 2008
 UAE President Cup: 2008–09
 UAE Super Cup: 2009

International
Chile
Copa América: 2015

Individual
 Bola de Prata: 2007
 Campeonato Brasileiro Série A Team of the Year: 2007
 Troféu Mesa Redonda: 2007
 Campeonato Paulista Most Valuable Player: 2007, 2008
 UFL Most Valuable Foreign Player: 2009

References

External links

 
 
 

1983 births
Living people
Sportspeople from Maracay
Chilean footballers
Chile international footballers
Chile under-20 international footballers
Venezuelan people of Chilean descent
Chilean expatriate footballers
Venezuelan emigrants to Chile
Citizens of Chile through descent
Naturalized citizens of Chile
University of the Americas (Chile) alumni
Colo-Colo footballers
Universidad de Concepción footballers
Rayo Vallecano players
Servette FC players
Sociedade Esportiva Palmeiras players
Al Ain FC players
Al Wahda FC players
Atlético Morelia players
Mazatlán F.C. footballers
Unión La Calera footballers
Club Necaxa footballers
Chilean Primera División players
Segunda División players
Swiss Super League players
Campeonato Brasileiro Série A players
Campeonato Brasileiro Série B players
UAE Pro League players
Liga MX players
2007 Copa América players
2011 Copa América players
2010 FIFA World Cup players
2014 FIFA World Cup players
2015 Copa América players
Copa América-winning players
Expatriate footballers in Spain
Chilean expatriate sportspeople in Spain
Expatriate footballers in Switzerland
Chilean expatriate sportspeople in Switzerland
Expatriate footballers in Brazil
Chilean expatriate sportspeople in Brazil
Expatriate footballers in the United Arab Emirates
Chilean expatriate sportspeople in the United Arab Emirates
Expatriate footballers in Mexico
Chilean expatriate sportspeople in Mexico
Association football midfielders
Chilean association football commentators